Paris Themmen (born June 25, 1959) is an American former actor who started his career as a child actor. He is best known for his role as Mike Teavee in Willy Wonka & the Chocolate Factory. After leaving acting, he worked in business as a real estate broker and casting director.

Early life
Themmen was born on June 25, 1959, in Boston, Massachusetts, to Ivana Marburger Themmen and Harold B. Themmen, both classical musicians. Themmen's mother was a renowned composer for orchestras in the late 20th century. A guitar concerto of hers was in final contention for the 1982 Kennedy Center Friedheim Award. Themmen's father, a graduate of the New England Conservatory of Music, was a clarinetist and librarian for the American Ballet Theatre, and also played for the Boston Pops Orchestra.

Career

Child actor
Themmen appeared in radio and TV commercials, voice-overs and theater performing on Broadway in Mame with Ann Miller in 1967 and in The Rothschilds in 1970. In 1971, aged 11, he got his breakthrough role in Willy Wonka and the Chocolate Factory as Mike Teevee.

Business careers
Declaring a hiatus from acting at age 14 to "just be a kid," Themmen went on to receive a B.F.A. in theatre from New York University. He founded Access International, a travel service that arranged Europe-bound charter flights for backpackers.

Following brief stints in real estate, film production, commercial casting, business representation at Walt Disney Imagineering, and a few other ventures, he now signs autographs at movie conventions, runs a photography business, and makes sporadic appearances in commercials, plays and TV shows.

Film appearance
Themmen's adult acting appearances include "Virtuoso", a 2000, sixth-season episode of the TV series Star Trek: Voyager, as a fawning fan. He was billed as a "former child star" in two 2008 episodes of the American game show Duel.

On May 4, 2011, Themmen appeared on the British television morning show Daybreak, alongside the other child actors from Willy Wonka & the Chocolate Factory: Peter Ostrum (Charlie Bucket), Julie Dawn Cole (Veruca Salt), Denise Nickerson (Violet Beauregarde) and Michael Bollner (Augustus Gloop). They made an additional 40th Anniversary reunion appearance on NBC's Today Show eleven days later. He reunited with the partial Wonka cast again on the program in 2015.

On January 23, 2015, Themmen appeared on Ken Reid's TV Guidance Counselor Podcast. The episode was recorded live in Wilmington, Massachusetts during North East ComicCon.

Themmen was a Jeopardy! contestant on March 13, 2018, finishing in second place. His wife, Nikki Grillos, previously appeared on the program in 2015, returning twice as a champion before being defeated on her third appearance.

Personal life
Themmen has been married to Nikki Grillos since 2014. Together, the couple currently resides in Los Angeles, California.

Themmen's sister Allegra Themmen-Pigott (1967–2019) was a coloratura soprano opera singer and music therapist. His sister Tania is married to voice actress and voice director Susan Blu.

Filmography

Film

Television

Film work

Theatre

References

External links

1959 births
Living people
20th-century American male actors
21st-century American male actors
American male child actors
American male film actors
American male stage actors
American male television actors
Jeopardy! contestants
Male actors from Massachusetts
New York University alumni
People from Boston
Jeopardy!